Jared is an unincorporated community in Pend Oreille County, in the U.S. state of Washington.

History
A post office called Jared was established in 1909, and remained in operation until 1943. The community was named after R. P. Jared, a local merchant.

References

Unincorporated communities in Pend Oreille County, Washington
Unincorporated communities in Washington (state)